Glossogobius is a genus of gobies native to fresh, brackish and marine waters from Africa to the coasts of the western Pacific Ocean. They are found in Madagascar, South Africa, Japan, Thailand, Australia, Indonesia, Bangladesh, the Philippines, Taiwan, Papua New Guinea, Singapore, Malawi, Eswatini, Botswana, Kenya, Zimbabwe, Tanzania, Mozambique, the Solomon Islands, Palau, Fiji, New Caledonia, India, Laos, Sri Lanka, Myanmar, Borneo, Nepal, Brunei Darussalam, Micronesia, Cambodia, Viet Nam, China, Réunion, the Seychelles, Mauritius, the Caroline Islands, Vanuatu, Malaysia and Russia. The genus also includes a troglobitic species, G. ankaranensis.

Species
There are currently 32 recognized species in this genus:
 Glossogobius ankaranensis Banister, 1994
 Glossogobius aureus Akihito & Meguro, 1975 (Golden tank goby)
 Glossogobius bellendenensis Hoese & G. R. Allen, 2009
 Glossogobius bicirrhosus M. C. W. Weber, 1894
 Glossogobius brunnoides Nichols, 1951 (Dusky mountain goby)
 Glossogobius bulmeri Whitley, 1959 (Bulmer's goby)
 Glossogobius callidus J. L. B. Smith, 1937
 Glossogobius celebius Valenciennes, 1837 (Celebes goby)
 Glossogobius circumspectus W. J. Macleay, 1883 (Circumspect goby)
 Glossogobius clitellus Hoese & G. R. Allen, 2012
 Glossogobius coatesi Hoese & G. R. Allen, 1990 (Coates' goby)
 Glossogobius concavifrons E. P. Ramsay & J. D. Ogilby, 1886 (Concave goby)
 Glossogobius flavipinnis Aurich, 1938 (Towuti yellowfin goby)
 Glossogobius giuris F. Hamilton, 1822 (Tank goby)
 Glossogobius hoesei G. R. Allen & Boeseman, 1982 (Hoese's goby)
 Glossogobius illimis Hoese & G. R. Allen, 2012 (False Celebius goby)
 Glossogobius intermedius Aurich, 1938
 Glossogobius kokius Valenciennes, 1837
 Glossogobius koragensis Herre,  1935 (Koragu tank goby)
 Glossogobius macrocephalus Hoese & G. R. Allen, 2015 
 Glossogobius mahalonensis Hoese, Hadiaty & Herder, 2015 (Mahalona bluefin goby) 
 Glossogobius matanensis M. C. W. Weber, 1913
 Glossogobius minutus C. Geevarghese & P. A. John, 1983
 Glossogobius multipapillus Hoese & G. R. Allen, 2015 
 Glossogobius munroi Hoese & G. R. Allen, 2012
 Glossogobius muscorum Hoese & G. R. Allen, 2009
 Glossogobius obscuripinnis W. K. H. Peters, 1868
 Glossogobius olivaceus Temminck & Schlegel, 1845
 Glossogobius robertsi Hoese & G. R. Allen, 2009
 Glossogobius sentaniensis Hoese & G. R. Allen, 2015 
 Glossogobius sparsipapillus Akihito & Meguro, 1976 (Linecheek tank goby)
 Glossogobius torrentis Hoese & G. R. Allen, 1990 (White water goby)

References

 
Gobiinae
Taxonomy articles created by Polbot